Sininkere (Silinkere) is a dialect of Soninke language of Burkina Faso.

References

Manding languages
Languages of Burkina Faso